Paul Marco (June 10, 1927 – May 14, 2006) was an American actor who often appeared in movies made by Ed Wood, including the "Kelton Trilogy" of Bride of the Monster, Night of the Ghouls and Plan 9 from Outer Space, in which he played a bumbling, fearful policeman named Kelton.

Career
Born in Los Angeles, Marco started taking lessons in drama, singing and dancing at an early age. After graduating from Hollywood High School, he served in the Navy during World War II. His first known movie role was a small part in the 1944 film Sweet and Low-Down with Benny Goodman, Jo Stafford, and The Pied Pipers.

In the early 1950s, The Amazing Criswell predicted on national television that Paul Marco would go far in the motion picture business. Criswell introduced Marco to Ed Wood shortly thereafter. In turn, Marco introduced Ed Wood to Bunny Breckinridge, a flamboyantly gay Shakespearean actor who lived with Marco for a time and co-starred in Wood's Plan 9 from Outer Space.

Marco depended on Wood for parts, and he more or less retired as an actor as Ed Wood's movies shifted more and more towards pornography for the last twenty years of his life.

In Tim Burton's 1994 movie Ed Wood, Paul Marco was portrayed by actor Max Casella.

Later life and death
In 1995 Marco recorded a 45, "Home on the Strange", in which he reprised his Kelton character for Dionysus Records. He revived Kelton once more in the 2005 science fiction satire/tribute film The Naked Monster, which also featured actors from Creature from the Black Lagoon, The Thing from Another World, The War of the Worlds, Beyond the Time Barrier, and The Indestructible Man, all reprising the roles they had played in the cited earlier films.

Marco hoped for a career revival with the "Dark Corner" series of shorts. He completed the first, entitled Kelton's Dark Corner (by Vasily Shumov), and was planning to shoot several scenes for the second before his death.

On May 14, 2006, Paul Marco died after a battle with hip problems and chronic illness, at the age of 78.

Filmography

Further reading
Sloan, Will. (April 2005). "Can Your Heart Stand the Shocking Facts About Kelton the Cop A/K/A Paul Marco?" Filmfax, p. 88–89

References

External links
Paul Marco's official website

Keltonsdarkcorner.com 

1927 births
2006 deaths
American male film actors
American male television actors
American people of Italian descent
Male actors from Los Angeles
United States Navy personnel of World War II
Burials at Hollywood Forever Cemetery
20th-century American male actors